Kenneth John Colvin (30 November 1938 – 17 November 2021) was an Australian rules footballer who played with South Melbourne in the Victorian Football League (VFL).

Colvin died from COVID-19 on 17 November 2021, at the age of 82.

Notes

External links 		
		
		

	
1938 births
2021 deaths		
Deaths from the COVID-19 pandemic in Australia
Australian rules footballers from Victoria (Australia)		
Sydney Swans players
Rochester Football Club players